Solør District Court was a district court in Innlandet county, Norway. The court was based in Flisa. The court existed from 1847 until 2021. It served the municipalities of Våler, Åsnes and Grue Cases from this court could be appealed to Eidsivating Court of Appeal.

The court was a court of first instance. Its judicial duties were mainly to settle criminal cases and to resolve civil litigation as well as bankruptcy. The administration and registration tasks of the court included death registration, issuing certain certificates, performing duties of a notary public, and officiating civil wedding ceremonies. Cases from this court were heard by a combination of professional judges and lay judges.

History
This court was created on 31 March 1847 when the old Solør og Odalen District Court was split in two: the new Solør District Court and the new Vinger og Odal District Court. The headquarters of the new Solør District Court were at Flisa. On 1 April 2006, the Solør District Court ceased to exist. Grue municipality was merged with the Vinger og Odal District Court which was then renamed Glåmdal District Court. Also on that date, the municipalities of Våler and Åsnes were transferred to the Sør-Østerdal District Court.

District stipendiary magistrates
The district stipendiary magistrate is the chief justice in a district court. The district stipendiary magistrates of Solør were:

1847–1869: Wilhelm J. B. Fietzentz
1859–1878: Philip Henrik Hansteen
1879–1899: Fredrik V. V. Norgrenn
1899–1917: Johann Bernt Krohg
1917–1922: Johan Georg Gulbranson
1922–1928: Johannes Nielsen Omsted
1928–1932: Søren Kristian Sætre
1932–1952: Jens Roll-Hansen
1952–1973: Finn Palmstrøm
1973–1977: Johannes Risting
1977–1993: Otto Weng
1993–2006: Einar Thomesen

References

Defunct district courts of Norway
Organisations based in Hedmark
1847 establishments in Norway
2006 disestablishments in Norway
Courts and tribunals established in 1847
Courts and tribunals disestablished in 2006